Albert Anthony Bansavage (January 9, 1938 – August 19, 2003) was an American football linebacker who played in the American Football League.

High school career
Bansavage prepped at Union Hill High School in Union City, New Jersey.

College career
Bansavage played college football at The Citadel and at Southern California. He waived his final year of eligibility to sign with the Baltimore Colts after being selected in the 1960 AFL draft.

Professional career
Bansavage played professionally in the American Football League for the Los Angeles Chargers in 1960 and the AFL's Oakland Raiders in 1961. He was at the center of a controversy in the 1960 season when the Raiders asked to have a game they lost to the Chargers forfeited due to Bansavage being an ineligible player.

See also
List of American Football League players

References

1938 births
2003 deaths
People from Union City, New Jersey
Players of American football from Jersey City, New Jersey
American football linebackers
Union Hill High School alumni
The Citadel Bulldogs football players
USC Trojans football players
Los Angeles Chargers players
Oakland Raiders players
American Football League players